Sharkey is an unincorporated community located in Tallahatchie County, Mississippi, United States.

Sharkey has a ZIP code of 38921.

References

Unincorporated communities in Tallahatchie County, Mississippi
Unincorporated communities in Mississippi